John Boardman may refer to:

 John Boardman (physicist) (born 1932), American physicist, science fiction fan, author and gaming authority
 Sir John Boardman (art historian) (born 1927), British classical art historian and archaeologist
 John Joseph Boardman (1893–1978), American Roman Catholic bishop
 John Boardman (merchant) (1758–1813), early settler of Troy, New York